The 2014 Indian general election in Himachal Pradesh were held for 4 seats in the state. The major two contenders in the state were Bharatiya Janta Party (BJP) and the Indian National Congress (INC). The voting process was held in a single phase on 7 May 2014.

Result

|- align=center
!style="background-color:#E9E9E9" class="unsortable"|
!style="background-color:#E9E9E9" align=center|Political Party
!style="background-color:#E9E9E9" |Votes
!style="background-color:#E9E9E9" |% of votes
!style="background-color:#E9E9E9" |Seats won
!style="background-color:#E9E9E9" |Seat change
|-
| 
|align="left"|Bharatiya Janata Party||1,652,995|| 53.85||4|| 1
|-

| 
|align="left"|Indian National Congress||1,260,477|| 41.07||0|| 1
|-
|
|align="left"|Total||||||4 
| -| 
|}

List of elected MPs
Keys:

References

Indian general elections in Himachal Pradesh
2010s in Himachal Pradesh
2014 Indian general election by state or union territory